Ismaël Haddou (born 15 February 1996) is an Algerian footballer who plays for AS Beauvais Oise. Haddou holds a French passport.

References

External links
 Profile at Soccerway

1996 births
Living people
Association football midfielders
Algerian footballers
French footballers
Ligue 2 players
Championnat National 2 players
Championnat National 3 players
S.S.D. Correggese Calcio 1948 players
Valenciennes FC players
US Marseille Endoume players
AS Beauvais Oise players
Expatriate footballers in Italy
21st-century Algerian people